The Convention of Klosterzeven (or the Convention of Kloster-Zeven) was a convention signed on 10 September 1757 at Klosterzeven between France and the Electorate of Hanover during the Seven Years' War that led to Hanover's withdrawal from the war and partial occupation by French forces. It came in the wake of the Battle of Hastenbeck  on 26 July in which Hanover had suffered a devastating defeat. Following the battle the Army of Observation had retreated northwards until it had reached Stade.

The agreement was deeply unpopular with Hanover's ally Prussia, whose western frontier was severely weakened by the agreement. After the Prussian victory at Rossbach on 5 November 1757, King George II was encouraged to disavow the treaty. Under pressure from Frederick the Great and William Pitt, the convention was subsequently revoked and Hanover re-entered the war the following year. The Duke of Cumberland, who had signed the agreement on behalf of Hanover, was disgraced when he returned to Britain, ending his previously distinguished military career. He was replaced as commander by Duke Ferdinand of Brunswick.

See also
 Great Britain in the Seven Years War

References

Bibliography

Diplomatic conferences in Germany
18th-century diplomatic conferences
1757 treaties
1757 in the Holy Roman Empire
Treaties of the Kingdom of France
1757 conferences